The 2014 PDC Pro Tour was a series of non-televised darts tournaments organised by the Professional Darts Corporation (PDC). Professional Dart Players Association Players Championships, UK Open Qualifiers, and European Tour events are the events that make up the Pro Tour. This year there were 34 PDC Pro Tour events held – 20 Players Championships, 6 UK Open Qualifiers, and 8 European Tour events.

Prize money
Prize money for each UK Open Qualifier was increased from £35,000 to £50,000 to match the 2013 Players Championships, which themselves remained unchanged for this year. European Tour events offered £100,000 per event, the same as in 2013.

PDC Pro Tour Card
128 players were granted Tour Cards, which enabled them to participate in all Players Championships, UK Open Qualifiers and European Tour events.

Tour Cards 
The 2014 Tour Cards were awarded to:
(63) The top 64 players from the PDC Order of Merit after the 2014 World Championship.  Co Stompé,  Jani Haavisto and  Steve Coote resigned their cards.
(42) The 42 qualifiers from 2014 Q-School.
(16) The 16 qualifiers from 2013 Q-School not ranked in the top 64 of the PDC Order of Merit following the World Championship.
(1) Four semi-finalists of the 2014 BDO World Darts Championship, only  Stephen Bunting accepted his tour card.
(1) The winner of the 2013 Scandinavian Order of Merit ( Per Laursen).
(1) The winner of the 2012 Scandinavian Order of Merit ( Jarkko Komula).
(2) Two highest qualifiers from 2013 Challenge Tour ( Ben Ward and  Adam Hunt).
(2) Two highest qualifiers from 2012 Youth Tour ( Chris Aubrey and  Josh Payne).

Lakeside Champion Stephen Bunting accepted his offer of a Tour Card, while a further 16 players won automatic Tour Cards at Qualifying School. To complete the field of 128 Tour Card Holders, places were allocated down the final Qualifying School Order of Merit, with 26 of the top 27 players taking a Tour Card.

Q School

The PDC Pro Tour Qualifying School took place at the Robin Park Tennis Centre in Wigan from January 15–18. The following players won two-year tour cards on each of the days played:

A Q School Order of Merit was also created by using the following points system:

To complete the field of 128 Tour Card Holders, places were allocated down the final Qualifying School Order of Merit, with 26 of the top 27 players taking a Tour Card. Stuart Bousfield turned down his chance to take up a Tour Card from the rankings, and as such is removed from the standings for 2014.

Players Championships
(All matches – best of 11 legs)

Players Championship 1 in Barnsley on 15 March.

Players Championship 2 in Barnsley on 16 March.

Players Championship 3 in Crawley on 22 March.

Players Championship 4 in Crawley on 23 March.

Players Championship 5 in Wigan on 12 April.

Players Championship 6 in Wigan on 13 April.

Players Championship 7 in Wigan on 3 May.

Players Championship 8 in Wigan on 4 May.

Players Championship 9 in Crawley on 24 May.

Players Championship 10 in Crawley on 25 May.

Players Championship 11 in Coventry on 14 June.

Players Championship 12 in Coventry on 15 June.

Players Championship 13 in Crawley on 13 September.

Players Championship 14 in Crawley on 14 September.

Players Championship 15 in Dublin on 4 October.

Players Championship 16 in Dublin on 5 October.

Players Championship 17 in Crawley on 18 October.

Players Championship 18 in Crawley on 19 October.

Players Championship 19 in Coventry on 22 November.

Players Championship 20 in Coventry on 23 November.

UK Open Qualifiers

European Tour
European Tour events had 48 players competing in each event this year instead of the 64 previously used. The top 16 on the one year Pro Tour Order of Merit entered each tournament at the last 32 stage. Twenty players from the UK Qualifier, eight from the European Qualifier and four from the Host Nation Qualifier in each event met in the first round with the 16 winners going on to face the 16 seeded players.

There were eight European Tour events this year:

PDC Youth Tour
The PDC Unicorn Youth Tour was open to players aged 16–21. The players who finished first and second on the Order of Merit will receive two-year Tour Cards to move onto the PDC ProTour in 2015 and 2016. In addition, the players who finished from third to eighth will receive free entry to the 2015 PDC Qualifying School. Dimitri van den Bergh and Josh Payne were the top two players at the end of the year.

PDC Challenge Tour
The PDC Unicorn Challenge Tour was open to all PDPA Associate Members who failed to win a Tour Card at Qualifying School. The players who finished first and second will receive two-year Tour Cards to move onto the PDC ProTour in 2015 and 2016. In addition, the players who finished from third to eighth will receive free entry to the 2015 PDC Qualifying School. Mark Frost and Alan Tabern were the top two players at the end of the year.

Scandinavian Darts Corporation Pro Tour
The Scandinavian Pro Tour had eight events this year, with a total of €40,000 on offer. The winner after all nine events (Jani Haavisto) will play in the 2015 World Championship.

Eurasian Darts Corporation (EADC) Pro Tour
The 2 EADC Pro Tour events and the 2015 World Championship Qualifier will be played at Omega Plaza Business Center, Moscow. Players from 
Armenia, Azerbaijan, Belarus, Georgia, Kazakhstan, Kyrgyzstan, Moldova, Russia, Tajikistan, Turkmenistan, Uzbekistan and Ukraine are eligible to play.

Australian Grand Prix Pro Tour

The Australian Grand Prix rankings are calculated from events across Australia. The top player in the rankings (Laurence Ryder) automatically qualified for the 2015 World Championship.

Other PDC tournaments
The PDC also held a number of other tournaments during 2014. These were mainly smaller events with low prize money, and some have eligibility restrictions. All of these tournaments are non-ranking.

References

External links
2014 PDC calendar
PDC event list

 
Pro Tour
PDC Pro Tour